The New Taipei Museum of Arts (NTMOA) is an upcoming museum in Yingge District, New Taipei, Taiwan.

History
The groundbreaking ceremony for the construction of the museum was held on 4 December 2018 attended by New Taipei Mayor Eric Chu. The museum is expected to be opened in 2022.

Architecture
The museum is designed by architect Kris Yao with an expected total floor area of 3.2 hectares. It will have 8 floors above ground and 3 floors below. It will consist of exhibition rooms, auditorium, children's art space, warehouse etc.

See also
 List of museums in Taiwan

References

External links
  

Buildings and structures under construction in Taiwan
Museums in New Taipei